The Second Battle of Lexington was a minor battle fought during Price's Raid as part of the American Civil War.  Hoping to draw Union Army forces away from more important theaters of combat and potentially affect the outcome of the 1864 United States presidential election, Sterling Price, a major general in the Confederate States Army, led an offensive into the state of Missouri on September 19, 1864.  After a botched attack at the Battle of Pilot Knob, the strength of the Union defenses at Jefferson City led Price to abandon the main goals of his campaign.

Additional Union troops were recalled from a campaign against the Cheyenne, and the Kansas State Militia was mobilized, but political authorities in Kansas would not allow the militiamen to serve east of the Big Blue River.  As a result, Major General James G. Blunt was only able to take 2,000 men east to confront Price.  By October 19, Blunt had occupied a position near the city of Lexington, which was soon attacked by lead elements of Price's army.  Blunt's men resisted strongly, despite being outnumbered, and forced Price to deploy the rest of his army and his heaviest artillery.  After gaining information about Price's strength and position that the Union high command had been previously lacking, Blunt withdrew from the field. Four days later, Price was decisively defeated at the Battle of Westport, and the Confederates were pursued, suffering several more defeats in the process.  By December, only 3,500 men of Price's initially 13,000-strong army remained.

Context

At the start of the American Civil War in 1861, the state of Missouri was a slave state, but did not secede.  However, the state was politically divided: Governor Claiborne Fox Jackson and the Missouri State Guard (MSG) supported secession and the Confederate States of America, while Brigadier General Nathaniel Lyon and the Union Army supported the United States and opposed secession.  Under Major General Sterling Price, the MSG defeated Union armies at the battles of Wilson's Creek and Lexington in 1861, but by the end of the year, Price and the MSG were restricted to the southwestern portion of the state.  Meanwhile, Jackson and a portion of the state legislature voted to secede and join the Confederate States of America, while another element of the legislature voted to reject secession, essentially giving the state two governments.  In March 1862, a Confederate defeat at the Battle of Pea Ridge in Arkansas gave the Union control of Missouri, and Confederate activity in the state was largely restricted to guerrilla warfare and raids throughout 1862 and 1863.

By the beginning of September 1864, events in the eastern United States, especially the Confederate defeat in the Atlanta campaign, gave Abraham Lincoln, who supported continuing the war, an edge in the 1864 United States presidential election over George B. McClellan, who favored ending the war.  At this point, the Confederacy had very little chance of winning the war.  Meanwhile, in the Trans-Mississippi Theater, the Confederates had defeated Union attackers during the Red River campaign in Louisiana, which took place from March through May.  As events east of the Mississippi River turned against the Confederates, General Edmund Kirby Smith, Confederate commander of the Trans-Mississippi Department, was ordered to transfer the infantry under his command to the fighting in the Eastern and Western Theaters.  However, this proved to be impossible, as the Union Navy controlled the Mississippi River, preventing a large scale crossing.  Despite having limited resources for an offensive, Smith decided that an attack designed to divert Union troops from the principal theaters of combat would have an equivalent effect as the proposed transfer of troops, through decreasing the Confederates' numerical disparity east of the Mississippi.  Price and the Confederate Governor of Missouri, Thomas Caute Reynolds, suggested that an invasion of Missouri would be an effective offensive; Smith approved the plan and appointed Price to command the offensive.  Price expected that the offensive would create a popular uprising against Union control of Missouri, divert Union troops away from principal theaters of combat (many of the Union troops previously defending Missouri had been transferred out of the state, leaving the Missouri State Militia to be the state's primary defensive force), and aid McClellan's chance of defeating Lincoln in the election. On September 19, Price's column, named the Army of Missouri, entered the state.

Prelude
When it entered the state, Price's force was composed of about 13,000 cavalrymen.  However, several thousand of these men were poorly armed, and all 14 of the army's cannons were underpowered.  Countering Price was the Union Department of Missouri, under the command of Major General William S. Rosecrans, who had fewer than 10,000 men on hand, many of whom were militiamen. In late September, the Confederates encountered a small Union force holding Fort Davidson near the town of Pilot Knob.  Attacks against the post in the Battle of Pilot Knob on September 27 failed, and the Union garrison abandoned the fort that night.  Price had suffered hundreds of casualties in the battle, and decided to divert the aim of his advance from St. Louis to Jefferson City.  Price's army was accompanied by a sizable wagon train, which significantly slowed its movement.  The delays caused by this slow progress enabled Union forces to reinforce Jefferson City, whose garrison was increased from 1,000 men to 7,000 between October 1 and October 6.  In turn, Price determined that Jefferson City was too strong to attack, and began moving westwards along the course of the Missouri River.  The Confederates gathered recruits and supplies during the movement; a side raid against the town of Glasgow on October 15 was successful, as was another raid against Sedalia.

Meanwhile, Union troops commanded by Major Generals Samuel R. Curtis and James G. Blunt were withdrawn from their role in fights against the Cheyenne; the Kansas State Militia was also mobilized. On October 15, Blunt moved a three-brigade unit under his command to Hickman Mills, Missouri; the third brigade was composed of militia. At this time, Price was at Marshall, east of Blunt's column. The next day, Curtis moved the Kansas militiamen to Kansas City, but was prohibited by the governor of Kansas from taking them east of the Big Blue River. On the 17th, Blunt detached his militia unit to Kansas City, and then sent his other two brigades to Holden. On October 18, Blunt's advance guard, commanded by Colonel Thomas Moonlight, occupied the town of Lexington, hoping to cooperate with a force commanded by Brigadier General John B. Sanborn to catch and trap Price. However, Sanborn's force was too far south of Lexington to move in concert with Blunt. Blunt then made the decision to reinforce his outer positions and resist the inevitable Confederate advance.

Battle

Price's army was split into three columns: Brigadier General Joseph O. Shelby commanded the advance guard. The overall force still numbered about 13,000 men. Blunt's force consisted of about 2,000 men and two batteries of four 12-pounder mountain howitzers. Shelby's cavalrymen made contact with Blunt's forward scouts around 14:00, and drove them back towards the main Union position. Blunt's main force made a stand against Shelby; leading Price to commit the forces of Major General James F. Fagan and Brigadier General John S. Marmaduke to the fray. For a time, Blunt's howitzers held the line. Price was also forced to deploy his heaviest artillery, and Blunt withdrew his men from near Lexington. In his after-action report, Blunt provided the significant amount his force was outnumbered by, as well as the fact that his mountain howitzers were unable to effectively respond to Price's artillery as reasons for the decision to withdraw. The 11th Kansas Cavalry Regiment served as a rear guard for Blunt until nightfall. Four of the mountain howitzers supported the Kansans during the rear guard action. While the action was a Confederate victory, Blunt had gained definite evidence about Price's strengths and exact movements, which the Union high command had been lacking since the time that Price was still in Arkansas.

Aftermath
Union casualties numbered about 40; Price gave no official total, but stated that his losses were "very light".  The Confederates spent the night near Fire Prairie Creek, while Blunt retreated to the Little Blue River.  Price continued moving westward, fighting several smaller actions along the way, before being decisively defeated by Curtis at the Battle of Westport on October 23, near Kansas City.  The Army of Missouri fell back through Kansas, suffering two defeats at the battles of Marais des Cygnes and Mine Creek on October 25; the latter defeat was particularly devastating, as Marmaduke and many other soldiers were captured.  Returning to Missouri, Price was further defeated at the Battle of Marmiton River on October 25 and again at the Second Battle of Newtonia on October 28.  Curtis pursued the Confederates all the way to the Arkansas River; the Confederates did not stop retreating until they reached Texas.  By December, only 3,500 men remained of the Army of Missouri.

A 2011 study by the American Battlefield Protection Program found that while the site of the battle is threatened by the development of Missouri Route 13, and is otherwise fragmented by development, opportunities for preservation remain at the site.  The same report noted that while none of the battlefield is on the National Register of Historic Places,  of the site are likely eligible for listing.  Battle of Lexington State Historic Site is concerned with the preservation of the 1861 First Battle of Lexington.

See also

List of American Civil War battles

References

Sources

 

 
 
 
 
 
 

1864 in Missouri
Lexington II
Lexington
Lexington II
Lafayette County, Missouri
Lexington II
Lexington II
October 1864 events